Nartap is a village in Kamrup, situated in north bank of river Brahmaputra .

Transport
Nartap is accessible through National Highway 31. All major private commercial vehicles ply between Nartap and nearby towns.

See also
 Pijupara
 Pingaleswar

References

Villages in Kamrup district